Arturo Chaires Riso (14 March 1937 – 18 June 2020) was a Mexican football defender who played for Mexico in the 1962 and 1966 FIFA World Cups. He also played for C.D. Guadalajara.

References

External links
 
FIFA profile

1937 births
2020 deaths
Footballers from Guadalajara, Jalisco
Association football defenders
Mexican footballers
Mexico international footballers
1962 FIFA World Cup players
1966 FIFA World Cup players
C.D. Guadalajara footballers
Liga MX players